Sagar Thapa (born 21 November 1985) is a footballer from Nepal, and was until October 2015 the captain of the national team. He made his first appearance for the Nepal national football team in 2003.
Since then, Thapa has represented his country in 50 international matches which puts him behind only Bal Gopal Maharjan and Upendra Man Singh. In October 2015, five members of the All Nepal Football Association, including Sagar Thapa and Sandip Rai, were arrested for match fixing. He was supposed to take 5 lakhs per fixed match.

Early life
Thapa was born in the village of Machhegaun in Kathmandu District, although he spent most of childhood in Dharan and Biratnagar. When he was in eight grade Thapa was offered a scholarship by the Daffodil School of Kathmandu. In 2001 at the age of 17 Thapa joined Friends Club. Initially he played as a forward and midfielder but after a being offered a vacant spot in central defense Thapa made the position his own.

Career

Yeti Himalayan Sherpa Club
Thapa started his career at the Himalayan Sherpa Club. His contract expired in 2012, but his decision to leave his club was heavily scrutinized in the media. The main reason why he left was because he felt that the salary of 50,000 rupees per month wasn't good enough, demanding that he and other prominent Nepali footballers should be paid 1 Lakh (or 100,000 rupees) per month.

Manang Marshyangdi Club
Thapa captained and played for Manang Marshyangdi Club in the domestic league. He also helped Manang Marshyangdi Club clinch A Division League in 2014. He was previously playing for Friends Club. He took the role of interim coach for Friends Club after their coach  Dilkaji Gurung resigned.

Nepali National Football team captain Sagar Thapa has been declared player of the year. All Nepal Football Association ( ANFA ) made such declaration amid a press conference in the Capital on Friday. On the occasion, ANFA awarded an apartment to Thapa. Receiving the award, Thapa said such honor for players have bestowed more responsibility upon them.

In January 2015 Thapa announced that he was leaving Manang Marshyangdi after a dispute over his salary.

Three Star Club
Latter that month it was announced that Thapa had signed with Three Star Club for the upcoming 2014–15 Martyr's Memorial A-Division League. On 1 October 2015 Thapa scored his first goal for the club with a well placed free-kick in the thirty-eight minute against Nepal Army Club. Thapa however received significant criticism in the same match as he insulted and yelled at referee Sharwan Lama after the latter had issued Thapa a yellow card. In the aftermath Thapa was suspended two games while Nepal Army Megh Raj KC was suspended for his out burst directed at the referee. Sharwan Lama was also penalized for not properly handling the incident.

International career
Thapa made his international debut in a 2004 AFC Asian Cup qualification match against Vietnam in 2003. Thapa became the permanent captain for his country during the 2010 AFC Challenge Cup. He is one of the most capped Nepalese footballers of all time with more than 50 appearances to his name. Perhaps his most famous moment for the national team was the last minute goal he scored from a free-kick during the 2011 SAFF Championship against Bangladesh that reminded many of Ronaldinho's memorable strikes.

International goals 

Scores and results list Nepal's goal tally first.

Personal life
Thapa is married, with two children.

Match fixing allegations
On 14 October 2015 Thapa, along with teammates Sandip Rai, Bikash Singh Chhetri, Ritesh Thapa and former Three Star Club coach Anjan KC were arrested by the Nepal Police on suspicion that the group was responsible for match-fixing at the domestic and international level. On 19 October 2015 Thapa and the four others were banned by the Asian Football Confederation.

References

1985 births
Living people
People from Kathmandu District
Nepalese footballers
Nepal international footballers
Manang Marshyangdi Club players
Three Star Club players
Footballers at the 2014 Asian Games
Association football central defenders
Sportspeople involved in betting scandals
Asian Games competitors for Nepal